Sir Dinshaw Maneckji Petit, 1st Baronet (30 June 18235 May 1901) was an Indian entrepreneur and founder of the first textile mills in India, as well as a great philanthropist. He was part of the Petit family and became the first Petit baronet.

Family
Dinshaw Maneckji Petit was born in Bombay, British India. In 1837, he married Sakarbai Panday, with whom he had 14 children (six sons and eight daughters). He was survived by, among others, his son Dinshaw Petit, who became the 2nd Baronet. His daughter Mithuben Hormusji Petit (11 April 1892 – 16 July 1973) was a female activist in the Indian independence movement, who famously participated in Mahatma Gandhi's Dandi March. 

His grandson Fali, who later became Sir Dinshaw Maneckji Petit, the 3rd Baronet, married Sylla Tata, a member of the Tata family and the sister of J. R. D. Tata, who later became the longest-serving chairman of the Tata Group, one of India's leading business conglomerates. His granddaughter Ratanbai Petit was the wife of the founder of Pakistan, Muhammad Ali Jinnah. Their daughter, Dina, was married to Bombay Dyeing chairman Neville Wadia, son of Sir Ness Wadia and Lady Evelyne Clara Powell Wadia. Neville and Dina had two children, a son, Nusli Wadia, and a daughter, Diana N. Wadia. Nusli is the current chairman of the Wadia Group. Nusli has two sons, Jehangir Wadia and Ness Wadia.

His son Dinshaw Maneckjee Petit achieved notoriety for his tax evasion and his penchant to set up shell companies to reduce his tax liability. The case of Dinsaw Maneckjee Petit is one of the few occasions where the government has seen fit to lift the corporate veil, due to the egregious nature of the tax avoidance.

Petit died on 5 May 1901 in Bombay. A posthumous portrait of the 1st Baronet was painted by Sir James Linton.

Career
As broker to European firms, Petit amassed a large fortune during the period of speculation in Bombay at the time of the American Civil War.  He founded the Manockji Petit Spinning & Weaving Mills.

In 1854, Petit founded the "Persian Zoroastrian Amelioration Fund" with the aim of improving the conditions for the less fortunate Zoroastrian co-coreligionists in Iran. The fund succeeded in convincing a number of Iranian Zoroastrians to migrate to India (where they are today known as Iranis), and may have been instrumental in obtaining a remission of the jizya poll tax for their co-religionists in 1882.

In 1886, he became a member of the governor-general's legislative council, where he was criticized for playing a pro-colonial role despite being a non-official nominee to the council. He was referred to as a "gilded sham" and a "magnificent non-entity" by the nationalists. He devoted his wealth to philanthropic objects, among the public and private charities which he endowed being the Towers of Silence and fire temples for the Parsi Zoroastrian community, a hospital for animals named Bai Sakarbai Dinshaw Petit Hospital for Animals (named after his wife), a college for women, and the Petit hospital.

For the advancement of technical education, Petit also donated premises worth Rs. 3,00,000 at Byculla, Bombay, to the famous Victoria Jubilee Technical Institute (VJTI) (recognized by the Government of Bombay as the Central Technological Institute, Bombay Province). In winter 1923, that institute relocated to its present location in Matunga, Bombay.

He was knighted by the British Crown in 1887, and on 1 September 1890, he became the first Petit baronet of Petit Hall, Bombay. The baronetcy was created with remainder to Framjee Petit, second son of the first Baronet, and the heirs male of his body, failing which to the heirs male of the body of the first Baronet. By Special Act of the Legislative Council of India, all holders of the title were to relinquish their own name on succession and assume those of the first Baronet.

The Petit surname is not traditionally Parsi and had come about in Sir Dinshaw's great-grandfather's time in the 18th century. He had worked as a shipping clerk and interpreter for the British East India Company. French merchants who dealt with the lively, short Parsi clerk called him "le petit Parsi".

Styles
1823-1886: Dinshaw Maneckji Petit
1886-1887: Dinshaw Maneckji Petit, C.S.I.
1887-1890: Sir Dinshaw Maneckji Petit
1890-1901: Sir Dinshaw Maneckji Petit, Bt

References

Dictionary of Indian Biography By C. E. Buckland page 335

1823 births
1901 deaths
Petit, Dinshaw Maneckji, 1st Baronet
Knights Bachelor
Parsi people from Mumbai
Parsi people
Indian baronets
Indian Knights Bachelor
Founders of Indian schools and colleges
Members of the Council of India
Indian businesspeople in textiles
Businesspeople from Mumbai
Members of the Bombay Legislative Council
Sheriffs of Mumbai
19th-century Indian philanthropists